Togo is a country in West Africa.

Togo may also refer to:

Locations

Japan
 Tōgō, Aichi, a town in Aichi Prefecture
 Tōgō, Kagoshima, a dissolved municipality of Kagoshima Prefecture
 Togo, Miyazaki, a town in Miyazaki Prefecture
 Tōgō, Tottori, a town in Tottori Prefecture
 Lake Tōgō, Tottori Prefecture

Other
 Togo, Saskatchewan, a small village in Canada
 Togoville, a town formerly known as Togo, in the southern part of Togo
 Togo Mountains, Togo
 Lake Togo, the largest part of a lagoon in Togo
 Togo, Kansas, United States, a ghost town
 Togo, Minnesota, United States, an unincorporated community
 Togo, Texas, United States, an unincorporated community

People
, Japanese admiral
, Japanese admiral
, Japanese architect
, Japanese painter and artist
, Foreign Minister of Japan
, Japanese actor
 Jonathan Togo (born 1977), American actor
 Togo Mizrahi (1901–1986), Egyptian director, actor, producer, and screenwriter
 Togo Palazzi (1932–2022), American retired National Basketball Association player
 Togo D. West Jr. (1942–2018), African-American lawyer and Secretary of Veterans Affairs
 Togo (comedian), stage name of Filipino entertainer Andres Solomon (1905–1952)
 Togo Igawa, stage name of Japanese actor Yoshiyuki Baba (born 1946)
, ring name of Japanese professional wrestler Shigeki Sato (born 1969)

Transportation
 Air Togo, an airline headquartered in Togo which operated between 1998 and 2000
 Togo station (Saskatchewan), Canada
 Tōgō Station, Munakata, Fukuoka, Japan

Other uses
 Togo (film), a 2019 American film
 Duke Togo (デューク・東郷), the main character of Japanese manga Golgo 13
 Togo (dog) (1913–1929), a famous sled dog
 TOGO, a Japanese builder of roller coasters
 German minelayer V 5908 Togo
 German night fighter direction vessel Togo
 Togo's, an American fast-food chain

See also
 Tōgō Shrine, Tokyo
 Take-out

Japanese masculine given names